James Alfred Jones (June 3, 1820  – February 26, 1894) was a nineteenth-century American  politician from Virginia.

Early life
Jones was born in Mecklenburg County, Virginia. in 1820 and graduated from Randolph-Macon College. In 1839 he attained a Master of Arts from the University of Virginia.

Career

After studying law in Richmond, Jones settled in Petersburg, Virginia, where practiced law.

In 1850, Jones was elected to the Virginia Constitutional Convention of 1850. He was one of four delegates elected from the central Piedmont delegate district made up of his home district of Petersburg City, and Chesterfield and Prince George Counties.

Jones was a member of the Virginia State Senate 1853/54 and reelected for the session 1855/56.

After his relocation to Richmond in 1857, he received an honorary Doctorate of Laws from Richmond College.

Death
James A. Jones died on February 27, 1894, in Richmond City, Virginia.

References

Bibliography

Virginia state senators
1820 births
1894 deaths
People from Mecklenburg County, Virginia
Randolph–Macon College alumni
University of Virginia alumni
Politicians from Petersburg, Virginia
19th-century American politicians